Woodroffe is a surname.

 Woodroffe (Surrey cricketer), English cricket player (first name unknown)
 Alison Broinowski (née Woodroffe), Australian academic, journalist, writer and former diplomat.
 Colin Woodroffe, Australian geographer and geomorphologist
 John Woodroffe, a British Orientalist whose work helped to unleash in the West a deep and wide interest in Hindu philosophy and Yogic practices.
 Kenneth Woodroffe (1892–1915), English cricketer and soldier 
 Martyn Woodroffe, Welsh swimmer who won a Silver medal at the 1968 Olympic Games
 Sir Nicholas Woodroffe, English Lord Mayor of London in the Elizabethan period
 Patricia Woodroffe, New Zealand fencer
 Patrick Woodroffe, English artist, specialising in fantasy & science-fiction artwork.
 Paul Woodroffe, British illustrator and stained glass artist
 Sidney Clayton Woodroffe, British V.C. awardee (World War I)

Other
Mount Woodroffe, a mountain in South Australia
Woodroffe, Northern Territory, a suburb of Darwin, Australia
Woodroffe Avenue, a road in Ottawa, Ontario, Canada
Woodroffe North, a neighbourhood in Ottawa
Woodroofe (surname), a similarly spelled surname
Woodruff (surname), a similarly spelled surname